The Jiles–Atherton model of magnetic hysteresis was introduced in 1984 by David Jiles and D. L. Atherton. This is one of the most popular models of magnetic hysteresis. Its main advantage is the fact that this model enables connection with physical parameters of the magnetic material. Jiles–Atherton model enables calculation of minor and major hysteresis loops. 
The original Jiles–Atherton model is suitable only for isotropic materials. However, an extension of this model presented by Ramesh et al. and corrected by Szewczyk  enables the modeling of anisotropic magnetic materials.

Principles 

Magnetization  of the magnetic material sample in Jiles–Atherton model is calculated in the following steps  for each value of the magnetizing field :
 effective magnetic field  is calculated considering interdomain coupling  and magnetization ,
 anhysteretic magnetization  is calculated for effective magnetic field ,
 magnetization  of the sample is calculated by solving ordinary differential equation taking into account sign of derivative of magnetizing field  (which is the source of hysteresis).

Parameters 

Original Jiles–Atherton model considers following parameters:

Extension considering uniaxial anisotropy introduced by Ramesh et al. and corrected by Szewczyk  requires additional parameters:

Modelling the magnetic hysteresis loops

Effective magnetic field
Effective magnetic field  influencing on magnetic moments within the material may be calculated from the following equation:

This effective magnetic field is analogous to the Weiss mean field acting on magnetic moments within a magnetic domain.

Anhysteretic magnetization 

Anhysteretic magnetization can be observed experimentally, when magnetic material is demagnetized under the influence of constant magnetic field. However, measurements of anhysteretic magnetization are very sophisticated due to the fact, that the fluxmeter has to keep accuracy of integration during the demagnetization process. As a result, experimental verification of the model of anhysteretic magnetization is possible only for materials with negligible hysteresis loop.
Anhysteretic magnetization of typical magnetic material can be calculated as a weighted sum of isotropic and anisotropic anhysteretic magnetization:

Isotropic 

Isotropic anhysteretic magnetization  is determined on the base of Boltzmann distribution. In the case of isotropic magnetic materials, Boltzmann distribution can be reduced to Langevin function connecting isotropic anhysteretic magnetization with effective magnetic field :

Anisotropic 

Anisotropic anhysteretic magnetization  is also determined on the base of Boltzmann distribution. However, in such a case, there is no antiderivative for the Boltzmann distribution function. For this reason, integration has to be made numerically. In the original publication, anisotropic anhysteretic magnetization  is given as:

where

It should be highlighted, that a typing mistake occurred in the original Ramesh et al. publication. As a result, for an isotropic material (where ), the presented form of anisotropic anhysteretic magnetization  is not consistent with the isotropic anhysteretic magnetization  given by the Langevin equation. Physical analysis leads to the conclusion that the equation for anisotropic anhysteretic magnetization  has to be corrected to the following form:

In the corrected form, the model for anisotropic anhysteretic magnetization  was confirmed experimentally for anisotropic amorphous alloys.

Magnetization as a function of magnetizing field 

In Jiles–Atherton model, M(H) dependence is given in form of following ordinary differential equation:

where  depends on direction of changes of magnetizing field  ( for increasing field,  for decreasing field)

Flux density as a function of magnetizing field 
Flux density  in the material is given as:

 

where  is magnetic constant.

Vectorized Jiles–Atherton model 

Vectorized Jiles–Atherton model is constructed as the superposition of three scalar models one for each principal axis. This model is especially suitable for finite element method computations.

Numerical implementation 

The Jiles–Atherton model is implemented in JAmodel, a MATLAB/OCTAVE toolbox. It uses the Runge-Kutta algorithm for solving ordinary differential equations. JAmodel is open-source is under MIT license.

The two most important computational problems connected with the Jiles–Atherton model were identified: 
 numerical integration of the anisotropic anhysteretic magnetization 
 solving the ordinary differential equation for  dependence.
For numerical integration of the anisotropic anhysteretic magnetization  the Gauss–Kronrod quadrature formula has to be used. In GNU Octave this quadrature is implemented as quadgk() function.

For solving ordinary differential equation for  dependence, the Runge–Kutta methods are recommended. It was observed, that the best performing was 4-th order fixed step method.

Further development 

Since its introduction in 1984, Jiles–Atherton model was intensively developed. As a result, this model may be applied for the  modeling of:
 frequency dependence of magnetic hysteresis loop in conductive materials 
 influence of stresses on magnetic hysteresis loops 
 magnetostriction of soft magnetic materials 

Moreover, different corrections were implemented, especially:
 to avoid unphysical states when reversible permeability is negative 
 to consider changes of average energy required to break pinning site

Applications 

Jiles–Atherton model may be applied for modeling:
 rotating electric machines 
 power transformers 
 magnetostrictive actuators 
 magnetoelastic sensors 
 magnetic field sensors (e. g. fluxgates) 

It is also widely used for electronic circuit simulation, especially for models of inductive components, such as transformers or chokes.

See also
 Preisach model of hysteresis
 Stoner–Wohlfarth model

References

External links 
 Jiles–Atherton model for Octave/MATLAB - open-source software for implementation of Jiles–Atherton model in GNU Octave and Matlab

Magnetic hysteresis